Lucien Spronck (19 August 1939 – 19 December 1989) was a Belgian footballer. He played in three matches for the Belgium national football team from 1962 to 1966.

References

External links
 

1939 births
1989 deaths
Belgian footballers
Belgium international footballers
Place of birth missing
Association football defenders